Sadiq Ali Shahzad is a sculptor from Multan, Pakistan.

Introduction
Sadiq Ali Shahzad belongs to Multan Pakistan. He started making paintings and sculptures without any formal education.

Achievements
He has made many famous and beautiful sculptures which are always on display at his workshop and Multan Arts Council in Multan. An art gallery is dedicated to him permanently in Multan Arts Council for this purpose. 
He was also given status of honorary sculptor at Bahauddin Zakariya University Multan.
Exhibition of his work in Al Hamra Art Gallery Lahore Pakistan

References
Jang News Sadiq Ali Shahzad

External links
Sadiq Ali Shehzad a tribute
News about Sadiq

Living people
Pakistani sculptors
Year of birth missing (living people)